|}

The Derby Trial Stakes is a Listed flat horse race in Great Britain open to three-year-old colts and geldings. It is run over a distance of 1 mile, 3 furlongs and 133 yards at Lingfield Park in May.

History
Established in 1932, the event serves as a trial for the Epsom Derby. The first running was won by the subsequent Derby winner April the Fifth.

The left-handed track at Lingfield Park is similar to that at Epsom. It has an undulating, cambered terrain with a sharp downhill turn into the home straight.

In total, nine winners of the race have achieved victory in the Derby. The most recent was Anthony Van Dyck in 2019. The most recent participant to win the Derby is Adayar, the 2021 runner-up.

For a period the Derby Trial Stakes held Group 3 status. It was relegated to Listed level in 2013.

Records

Leading jockey (6 wins):
 Harry Carr – Black Tarquin (1948), Aureole (1953), Doutelle (1957), Alcide (1958), Parthia (1959), Pardao (1961)

Leading trainer (10 wins):
 Cecil Boyd-Rochfort – Hypnotist (1939), Black Tarquin (1948), Brown Rover (1949), North Carolina (1951), Aureole (1953), Doutelle (1957), Alcide (1958), Parthia (1959), Jet Stream (1960), Pardao (1961)

Winners since 1979

Earlier winners

 1932: April the Fifth
 1933: Myosotis
 1934: Medieval Knight
 1935: Field Trial
 1936: Barrystar
 1937: Mid-day Sun
 1938: Blandstar
 1939: Hypnotist
 1940–45: no race
 1946: Fast and Fair
 1947: Sayajirao
 1948: Black Tarquin
 1949: Brown Rover
 1950: Tramper
 1951: North Carolina
 1952: Tulyar
 1953: Aureole
 1954: Rowston Manor
 1955: True Cavalier
 1956: Induna
 1957: Doutelle
 1958: Alcide
 1959: Parthia
 1960: Jet Stream
 1961: Pardao
 1962: Pindaric
 1963: Duplation
 1964: Oncidium
 1965: Solstice
 1966: Black Prince II
 1967: Heave Ho
 1968: Laureate
 1969: The Elk
 1970: Meadowville
 1971: Homeric
 1972: Charling
 1973: Ksar
 1974: Bustino
 1975: Patch
 1976: Norfolk Air
 1977: Caporello
 1978: Whitstead

See also
 Horse racing in Great Britain
 List of British flat horse races

References

 Paris-Turf:
 Racing Post:

 galopp-sieger.de – Lingfield Derby Trial Stakes.
 horseracingintfed.com – International Federation of Horseracing Authorities – Derby Trial Stakes (2012).
 pedigreequery.com – Lingfield Derby Trial Stakes – Lingfield.
 

Flat horse races for three-year-olds
Lingfield Park Racecourse
Flat races in Great Britain
1932 establishments in England
Recurring sporting events established in 1932